Jane Ritchie  (née Beaglehole; born 12 February 1936) is a New Zealand psychology academic and expert of child-raising. She is currently an emeritus professor at the University of Waikato. She was the first woman to graduate with a PhD in psychology from a New Zealand university.

Biography
Ritchie was born on 12 February 1936 in Honolulu as Jane Beaglehole, the daughter of psychologist and ethnologist Ernest Beaglehole, They lived in New Zealand from 1937. She received her education at Karori School and Wellington Girls' College. She then studied at Victoria University and obtained a Bachelor of Arts in 1956, a Master of Arts in 1957, and a PhD in 1963. Her 1957 master thesis was titled Childhood in Rakau: A Study of the First Five Years of Life and the PhD, submitted in 1962, had the title Maori Families: an Exploratory Study in Wellington City. While at Victoria, she met and married James Ritchie, and the two collaborated on almost all their future research, just as her parents had done.

They both moved to University of Waikato, and both rose to full professor. She was a postdoctoral research fellow from 1973 to 1975, a lecturer from 1976 to 1979, a senior lecturer from 1980 to 1984. She was promoted to associate professor in 1985, and in 1995 was appointed a professor.

James Ritchie died in 2009 and Jane retired in 2010. Two younger brothers have achieved notability. David Beaglehole (1938–2014) was a physicist at Victoria University. Robert Beaglehole (born 1945) is an emeritus professor in epidemiology at the University of Auckland.

Awards and honours
In the 1989 New Year Honours, Ritchie was appointed an Officer of the Order of the British Empire, for services to women, education and the community. In 2017, she was selected as one of the Royal Society of New Zealand's "150 women in 150 words".

Selected works 
 Ritchie, Jane, and James E. Ritchie. Violence in New Zealand. Huia Publishers, 1993.
 Ritchie, Jane, and James E. Ritchie. Child rearing patterns in New Zealand. AH & AW Reed, 1970.
 Ritchie, Jane. Childhood in Rakau: the first five years of life. No. 10. Victoria Univ., 1957.
 Ritchie, Jane, and James E. Ritchie. The next generation: Child rearing in New Zealand. Penguin Books, 1997.
 Ritchie, Jane. Chance to be equal. Cape Catley, 1978.

Notes

References

Living people
New Zealand women academics
New Zealand psychologists
New Zealand women psychologists
Victoria University of Wellington alumni
Academic staff of the University of Waikato
New Zealand Officers of the Order of the British Empire
1936 births
People educated at Wellington Girls' College
Beaglehole family